Basilica of Santa Margherita is a Neo-gothic style, Roman Catholic church, located just outside the Tuscan town of Cortona, Italy, at the intersection of Via delle Santucce and Via  Sant Margherita, on a hill just below the Fortezza Medicea, and dedicated to a native saint of town, Margaret of Cortona.

History
The church was originally the site of a small oratory dedicate to San Basilio, and built by Camaldolese Monks in the 11th century. Damaged during the 1258 siege of the town by Arezzo, the church and adjacent convent were rebuilt in 1288 by efforts led by Margherita di Cortona herself, a Franciscan tertiary, and dedicated to Saints Basil, Egidius, and Catherine of Alexandria. It was then still called an oratory and measured only 15 meters long, and was adjacent to a small chapel of St Basil. Margaret died in 1297 in a room behind the old church where she had lived the last years of her life; the room roughly corresponded to the present site of the 3rd altar on the left of the nave. She was buried in a wall of the chapel of St Basil. By 1330, the Cortonese had constructed a larger church and designed by Giovanni Pisano, in part to house her relics, disinterred in 1456, in that had become a source of veneration. The old church now became part of the nave of the newer, 30 meter long, structure. The saint was canonized in 1728.

Fragments of a fresco from the church, attributed to Pietro Lorenzetti, is now conserved in the Diocesan Museum. Other 14th-century frescoes such as ones by Barna da Siena have disappeared. Many of the canvases once in the interior have been dispersed or moved.

The church underwent major enlargements and reconstructions in 1738 and in 1874-1878; only the choir and two vaults, the second and third of the central nave, remain from the original church. The present Gothic Revival architecture style church is the work of Enrico Presenti and Mariano Falcini. The facade was designed by Domenico Mirri (1856-1939), and completed by Giuseppe Castellucci.

The rich marble mausoleum on the left of the transept by the Sienese workshops and the saint's silver casket (1774) at the main altar, displaying her incorrupt body, was designed by Pietro Berrettini. The main altarpiece once held a large Deposition by Luca Signorelli, now in the Diocesane museum. The marble statue (1781) of the saint in a niche on the right was sculpted by Vincenzo Pacetti.

The second altar on the right has an altarpiece depicting Virgin and St Elizabeth of Hungary, by Jacopo da Empoli. On an altar on the right there is a 13th-century wooden crucifix, originally from in the church of San Francesco, Cortona. It is said St Margaret prayed before this crucifix. On the right side walls there are relics and captured standards donated by the Knights of Malta stationed in Cortona. On the left nave we see a large chapel in memory of those Cortonese fallen  during the war, with frescos by Osvaldo Bignami. The first altar on the left had an altarpiece depicting Saints Louis of Toulouse, Francis, Dominic, and Margaret by Francesco Vanni. the second altar had a painting depicting the Massacre of the Innocents by Pietro Giannotti.

The church was elevated to the status of minor basilica in 1927. Behind the church is the bell-tower (1650) and a monastery of the Franciscan Order.

References

External links 
 Sanctuary of Saint Margaret of Cortona

Gothic Revival church buildings in Italy
Roman Catholic churches in Cortona
13th-century Roman Catholic church buildings in Italy
19th-century Roman Catholic church buildings in Italy
Cortona